Astatinae are a cosmopolitan group of solitary wasps, peculiar for their males having very large compound eyes that broadly meet at the top of the head. The largest genus in this subfamily is Astata, with about half of more than 160 species in the subfamily.

Phylogenomic analysis of Apoidea published in 2018 suggested that Astatinae, along with several other subfamilies and a subtribe, should be promoted to family rank: Ammoplanina (= Ammoplanidae), Astatinae (= Astatidae), Bembicinae (= Bembicidae), Mellininae  (= Mellinidae), Pemphredoninae (= Pemphredonidae), Philanthinae (= Philanthidae), and Pseninae (= Psenidae).

References 

Crabronidae
Apocrita subfamilies
Biological pest control wasps